The 1934–35 season of La Liga began on 2 December 1934 and finished on 28 April 1935. It was won by Betis for the first and to date only time. It was also the first time Sevilla, Betis cross-city rival participated.

Team information

League table

Results

Top scorers

Pichichi Trophy
Note: This list is the alternative top scorers list provided by newspaper Diario Marca; it differs from the one above which is based on official match reports.

References
La liga top scorers 1934/35

External links
LFP website

1934 1935
1934–35 in Spanish football leagues
Spain